This page provides the summary of the second round qualifiers for the group stage of the Asian football qualifiers for 2008 Olympics. The matches in this round were held on 28 February 2007 to 6 June 2007.

Matches

Group A

Group B

Group C 

The match was cancelled because of the Cyclone Gonu

Group D

Group E 

India was awarded a win after Thailand used a suspended player.

Group F

Notes

External links 
 Official site of the AFC Men's Olympic Qualifiers

Afc, Men